Antonio Salvetti (1854 – August 17, 1931) was an Italian architect and painter.
[[Image:Antonio salvetti, la nicchia (estate sulle rive dell'elsa), 1894, 02.jpg|thumb|La Nicchia]]

He was born in Colle di Val d'Elsa in Tuscany. He studied Architecture at the Royal Florentine Academy of Fine Arts, specializing in portraits. He lived for long periods of time in Paris and Munich. In Florence, he befriended many of the Macchiaioli painters, including Vittorio Meoni, Niccolò Cannicci, and Telemaco Signorini.

He painted many portraits, including in pastel, and many studies of painting. He returned to Italy, settling in Lombardy for a spell. In 1878 in Florence, he won awards for his architectural designs. He made many designs for the Ricordi di Architettura. In the 1888 Bologna Exhibition, he was awarded a medal. Salvetti's principal works include the following canvases: Casa Calzaveglio in Brescia; Napoletana of Venice; Portrait (pastel); Profilo di donna; study of a child; portrait of a signora; Love Letter; Guida Alpina Tirolese; Study of Head in pastel; La Nonna (pastel); Pastel self-portrait; Alla finestra (pastel); and Near the Crib.

See alsoIl pittore Antonio Salvetti – Consigliere comunale e Sindaco di Colle di Val d’Elsa 1895-1899'', monograph by Meris Mezzedimi.

References

1854 births
1931 deaths
Architects from Tuscany
19th-century Italian architects
19th-century Italian painters
Italian male painters
20th-century Italian painters
Painters from Tuscany
19th-century Italian male artists
People from Colle di Val d'Elsa
20th-century Italian male artists